In England, an integrated care system (ICS) is a statutory partnership of organisations who plan, buy, and provide health and care services in their geographical area. The organisations involved include the NHS, local authorities, voluntary and charity groups, and independent care providers. The NHS Long Term Plan of January 2019 called for the whole of England to be covered by ICSs by April 2021. On 1 July 2022, ICSs replaced clinical commissioning groups in England.

Statutory bodies
The Health and Care Act 2022 put these systems on a statutory basis, each with an approved constitution. On 1 July 2022, a total of 42 ICSs became statutory. There are more than 70 performance metrics by which they are judged, grouped into six "oversight themes": quality, access and outcomes, preventing ill health and reducing inequalities, leadership, people, and finances. The poorest performers will be put in a "recovery support programme", which will replace the label of special measures. Each system is to set their own constitution, determine staff pay and can raise "additional income" but the chair must be approved by the Secretary of State for Health and Social Care.

The areas covered by each ICS vary considerably by population and demographics. Population size ranges from 500,000 to more than 3 million people. Some have more than 10 upper-tier local authorities and some only one. Nearly 50% of the neighbourhoods in Birmingham and Solihull are in the most deprived fifth of the neighbourhoods nationally, compared to 1% in Surrey Heartlands.

Governance
NHS England produced a model constitution in July 2021, which systems are expected to use when developing their own arrangements. Each ICS must have an integrated care board with at least five executive directors and three non-executives.

Integrated care partnership 
The boards must work with local authorities to create an integrated care partnership (ICP) committee for each system, to include local organisations such as the voluntary sector and social enterprises. The ICP works on prevention, wider social and economic factors affecting health, and reducing health inequalities.

Pharmacy 
Each ICS is to have a community pharmacy clinical lead, funded by the Pharmacy Integration Programme for the first two years.

History

2017: The first accountable care systems 
Eight sustainability and transformation plan areas in England were named in June 2017 by Simon Stevens, chief executive of NHS England, as a first wave in the development of what were then called accountable care systems. He said they "will bring together providers and commissioners to help break down barriers between primary, secondary and social care". They would be given up to £450 million between them in transformation funding over the next 4 years. The eight were:

Frimley Health and Care System – a consortium of 30 public and private care providers with five clinical commissioning groups, five GP federations, 10 local, district and county authorities, two ambulance trusts and five mental health and community providers including Virgin Care;
 South Yorkshire and Bassetlaw – seven NHS hospital trusts covering 15 hospital sites, which employ 45,000 staff and service 2.3 million residents;
Nottinghamshire – with an initial focus on Greater Nottingham and the southern part of the sustainability and transformation partnership; includes seven public bodies and Circle Health;
Blackpool and Fylde Coast, with the potential to spread to other parts of the Lancashire and South Cumbria STP at a later stage;
Dorset;
Luton, with Milton Keynes and Bedfordshire;
West Berkshire;
Buckinghamshire.

Greater Manchester was not included because it already had more advanced arrangements under its 2015 "devolution" deal. Surrey Heartlands began a similar arrangement in 2018.

In each area a provider or, more usually, an alliance of providers will collaborate to meet the needs of a defined population with a budget determined by capitation. There will be a contract that specifies the outcomes and other objectives they are required to achieve within the given budget over a period of time. This may extend well beyond health and social care services to encompass public health and other services. In Manchester, the objectives are specified over ten years. Keeping people out of hospital by moving services into the community is a common feature. NHS trusts, Clinical Commissioning Groups and local authorities in the new ACSs will "take on clear collective responsibility for resources and population health".

The process was denounced by John Sinnott, Chief Executive of Leicestershire County Council in September 2017 as lacking any element of public accountability. He said that existing models in other countries were interesting but not relevant to democratic accountabilities in the UK since they had different governance structures and forms of service provision.

It is proposed that systems employing general practitioners would have to meet the costs of their indemnity insurance.

In September 2017 NHS England produced a handbook designed to support the creation of new payment models which are intended to remove the direct relationship between NHS activity and payment, improve the alignment of payment for all providers within the care model and better incentivise prevention and wellbeing.

2018: Integrated care systems

In February 2018 it was announced that these organisations were in future to be called integrated care systems, and that all 44 sustainability and transformation plans would be expected to progress in this direction. The ten pioneer systems were described as nascent and fragile by the Health Select Committee in May 2018. They were described by Chris Ham as "coalitions of the willing" in 2018. He said that real progress had only happened in places where there was a history of collaborative working. He also commented that there was little guidance and so more latitude than is usually the case with national NHS initiatives.

In January 2019 it was announced in the NHS Long Term Plan that by April 2021 integrated care systems were to cover the whole of England with a single clinical commissioning group for each area. Each one will be run by a partnership board with members from commissioners, trusts, and primary care.

Three more areas were designated in June 2019, and four more in May 2020 (Hertfordshire and West Essex, Humber, Coast and Vale, South West London, and Sussex), bringing the total to 18.

Nineteen NHS minority ethnic leaders demanded in March 2021 that the executive officers (not just the non-executives) in the 42 emerging ICSs should be representative of the ethnic diversity in their communities. They wanted to see ethnic diversity and inclusion a part of every NHS board's core business and that every system should develop a 10-year strategy, with annual milestones, for reducing inequalities. In July 2021 chairs had been appointed for 25 of the 42 NHS integrated care boards. 11 are women, and five have a minority ethnic background. The chairs must not be councillors or MPs, or to work for any of their ICS's constituent organisations.

Integrated care providers

A consultation on the draft contracts for what were then called integrated care providers (ICPs) was launched by NHS England in August 2018 after the failure of two legal challenges to an earlier draft contract. The consultation said that this was not a new type of legal entity, but merely the "provider organisation which is awarded a contract by commissioners for the services which are within scope." Dudley clinical commissioning group is at the forefront of this exercise and will be able to implement the draft voluntary contract, subject to the outcome of this consultation exercise. It is proposed that general practitioners will be able to sign fully or partially integrated contracts, and that fully integrated practices would give up their existing contracts to become salaried.

Evaluation
A report from the Nuffield Trust in December 2021 found that there was very little evidence that integration policies across the UK – including pooling budgets and creating new integrated boards and committees – had dramatically improved patient experience, quality of services or supported the delivery of more care outside of hospitals. They warned that without concurrent investment in social care and broader public services, it was “very likely” further reforms would not yield the desired results.

Integrated Care Boards
On 1 July 2022 NHS England established 42 integrated care boards, covering the whole of England.

References

External links
 

Managed care
National Health Service (England)